Kennamer is a surname. Notable people with the surname include:

Charles Brents Kennamer (1874–1955), American judge
Franklin Elmore Kennamer (1879–1960), American judge
Seaborn Kennamer (1830–1915), American politician

Surnames of Dutch origin